Robert, Rob, Bob or Bobby Murphy may refer to:

Sports

Ice hockey
Robert Ronald Murphy or Ron Murphy (1933–2014), Canadian ice hockey player
Bob Murphy (ice hockey) (born 1951), Canadian retired professional ice hockey player
Rob Murphy (ice hockey) (born 1969), Canadian retired ice hockey player

Other sports
Bobby Murphy (soccer), soccer coach 
Bob Murphy (baseball) (1866–1904), American baseball pitcher
Robert M. Murphy (died 1925), American football administrator
Irish Bob Murphy (1922–1961), American light heavyweight boxer
Bob Murphy (sportscaster) (1924–2004), American sports announcer
Bob Murphy (golfer) (born 1943), American PGA winning golfer
Bob Murphy (rower) (born 1950), New Zealand representative rower
Rob Murphy (born 1960), American retired baseball player
Rob Murphy (basketball) (born 1973), American basketball executive and former coach
Rob Murphy (gridiron football) (born 1977), American former professional gridiron football player
Robert Murphy (footballer) (born 1982), Australian rules footballer with the Western Bulldogs

Politics
Robert S. Murphy (1861–1912), American politician, Lieutenant Governor of Pennsylvania, 1907–1911
Robert Murphy (Australian politician) (1876–1966)
Robert Daniel Murphy (1894–1978), American diplomat
Robert F. Murphy (politician) (1899–1976), American retired Democratic politician, Lieutenant Governor of Massachusetts, 1957–1961
Bob Murphy (politician), 2011 elected mayor of Lakewood, Colorado

Others
Bobby Murphy (businessman) (born 1988), American billionaire co-founder of Snapchat
Bob Murphy (musician), Canadian jazz pianist
Robert C. Murphy (judge) (1926–2000), American lawyer and judge
Robert Cushman Murphy (1887–1973), American ornithologist
Robert F. Murphy (anthropologist) (1924–1990), American anthropologist
Robert F. Murphy (computational biologist), professor of computational biology at Carnegie Mellon University
Robert P. Murphy (born 1976), American Austrian School economist and libertarian
Robert Murphy (mathematician), Irish mathematician
Robert C. Murphy (colonel), American colonel in the Union Army during the American Civil War
Robert L. Murphy, American infectious disease physician and professor of medicine
Robert Murphy (cinematographer) (born 1970), American cinematographer, see In Search of a Midnight Kiss and Meet Me in Montenegro
Robert Murphy (producer), British TV writer and producer, see Murder City, DCI Banks or Losing Gemma
Robert William Murphy (1902–1971), American author, Saturday Evening Post, winner of the Dutton Animal Book Award